Greene Central High School is a public high school located in Greene County, North Carolina. The middle school feeding upcoming students into Greene Central is Greene County Middle School. The school mascot is the Ram. It is one of five schools of the Greene County School System.

Notable alumni

Blue Edwards, former NBA player
Cliff Godwin, college baseball head coach
Rapsody, hip hop artist

References

External links
 

Public high schools in North Carolina
Schools in Greene County, North Carolina